Basher is an unincorporated community in Douglas County, Missouri, United States.

History
A post office called Basher was established in 1907, and remained in operation until 1920. The community was named after Harve Bash, the original owner of the site.

References

Unincorporated communities in Douglas County, Missouri
1907 establishments in Missouri
Unincorporated communities in Missouri